Linda Q. Smyth is a former member of the Fairfax County Board of Supervisors for the Providence district, serving from 2003 until her retirement after the 2019 election in which she was succeeded by school board member Dalia Palchik.

Political Career and Community Involvement
Linda Smyth has been a resident of Fairfax County, Virginia since 1972.

In 1999, Providence District Supervisor Gerry Connolly appointed Smyth to the Fairfax County Planning Commission to replace attorney Carl A. S. Coan, Jr.

When Connolly decided to run for Chairman of the Board of Supervisors following Katherine Hanley's decision to not seek a second term in 2003, Smyth decided to seek the Providence District seat he would be vacating.

At the Democratic caucus held in May 2003, Smyth, backed by Connolly, defeated slow growth advocate Becky Cate, who was supported by former Board Chairman Audrey Moore, and Pat Morrison.

She was elected to her first term as Supervisor for the Providence District in November 2003, defeating Republican James E. Hyland, and sworn in on December 15, 2003.

Unhappiness with development projects in Smyth's Providence District, such as in Tysons Corner and the Merrifield-Dunn Loring neighborhood, as well as the development of the MetroWest planned community near the Vienna Metro station, led to community activist Charles W. Hall challenging Smyth in the 2007 Democratic primary. Smyth defeated Hall in the June primary, and went on to run unopposed in the November 2007 election.

Smyth was elected to her third four-year term in November 2011, defeating Republican Chris S. Grisafe.

Currently, Smyth chairs the Board of Supervisors' Technology Committee.

In addition, Smyth is the on the Board of Directors of the Virginia Association of Counties and serves on the Metropolitan Washington Council of Governments Transportation Planning Board and Metropolitan Washington Air Quality Committee, and the Northern Virginia Regional Commission.

References

External links 

Living people
Virginia Democrats
Members of the Fairfax County Board of Supervisors
Women in Virginia politics
People from Cape Girardeau, Missouri
21st-century American politicians
1949 births
21st-century American women politicians
University of Virginia alumni
Washington University in St. Louis alumni